Richard Fletcher (1544/5, Watford – 15 June 1596) was a Church of England priest and bishop.  He was successively Dean of Peterborough (1583–89), bishop of Bristol (1589–93), Bishop of Worcester (1593–95) and Bishop of London (1595–96).

Fletcher was educated at Norwich School and at Trinity College, Cambridge, matriculating in 1562, graduating B.A. 1566. Moving to Corpus Christi College, where he gained a fellowship in 1569, he graduated M.A. 1569, B.D. 1576, D.D. 1580. He was the father of playwright John Fletcher.

During Fletcher's time as Dean of Peterborough Cathedral he was present at the execution of Mary, Queen of Scots on 8 February 1587, described by Fraser as "pray(ing) out loud and at length, in a prolonged and rhetorical style as though determined to force his way into the pages of history" (1969:584), and presided over her initial funeral and burial at Peterborough Cathedral.

Fletcher was elected Bishop of Bristol on 13 November 1589 and consecrated on 14 December 1589. He was translated to the bishopric of Worcester on 10 February 1593, and to the bishopric of London on 10 January 1595.

Fletcher died in office on 15 June 1596.

References

Sources

External links
Usher, Brett, ‘Fletcher, Richard (1544/5–1596)’, Oxford Dictionary of National Biography, Oxford University Press, Sept 2004; online edn, Jan 2008, accessed 3 Jan 2008
 

1545 births
1596 deaths
Bishops of Bristol
Bishops of London
Bishops of Worcester
16th-century Church of England bishops
Fellows of Corpus Christi College, Cambridge
Alumni of Trinity College, Cambridge
Deans of Peterborough
People educated at Norwich School
People from Watford